The Arkansas Women's Hall of Fame is a non-profit, volunteer organization that recognizes women who have contributed to history of the U.S. state of Arkansas.

History
The organization was founded and incorporated as a non-profit organization in 2014 to recognize women's contributions and impact upon the state of Arkansas. It was formed as a partnership between the Arkansas Business Publishing Group and the North Little Rock Chamber of Commerce. An eleven-member board was developed to create a permanent location for the Hall of Fame and a sustained tribute to the women who have helped to build the state. Until a permanent facility is built, the plans call for a statewide traveling exhibit on the inductees. The inaugural group of women, inducted on 27 August 2015, included 11 women and one organization, the Women's Emergency Committee to Open Our Schools and were selected from public nominations of 73 potential candidates.

Criteria
The criteria for induction into the Arkansas Women's Hall of Fame is that women were born in and achieved recognition within the state; are or have been a resident in Arkansas for an extended period of time and achieved prominence within the state; or were born in or lived in Arkansas for a significant period of time and achieved prominence elsewhere. Additional criteria:
 Made significant and enduring contributions to their field, whether professional or not;
 Made improvements to the cultural, economic, political or social status of their community, the state or the nation;
 Elevated the status of women and/or girls;
 Helped open new frontiers for women and the general society;
 Were inspirational role models.

Inductees
The hall inducts new members annually and includes both contemporary and historical women or organizations which benefit women.

References

Further reading

External links
Arkansas Women's Hall of Fame official page

Lists of American women
Women's halls of fame
Organizations established in 2014
2014 establishments in Arkansas
Halls of fame in Arkansas
State halls of fame in the United States
History of women in Arkansas
Lists of people from Arkansas